Fonte do Bastardo is a parish in the municipality of Praia da Vitória on the island of Terceira in the Portuguese Azores. It contains the localities Canada dos Picos, Fonte do Bastardo, Lajedo, Nogueira, Recanto, Regêlo, Ribeira Seca de Baixo, Ribeira Seca de Cima and São José.

References

External links

Freguesias of Praia da Vitória